Captain James Cornewall (1698 – 11 February 1744) was an officer in the British Royal Navy who became a national hero following his death at the Battle of Toulon in 1744. His monument in Westminster Abbey was the first ever to be erected by Parliament at public expense.

Early life and career

He was born in 1698, the youngest son of Henry Cornewall and his second wife Susanna, and was baptised at Moccas on 17 November 1698.

Three years later he was given his first independent command, being promoted to become captain of the Fifth-rate  on 3 April 1724. He spent four years aboard this ship, principally in the waters off Boston, protecting trade and suppressing piracy. John Knox Laughton compares this phase of his life to "the opening chapters of Fenimore Cooper's Water Witch and Red Rover."

While in Boston, Cornwall drew the ire of provincial authorities for heavy-handedness. When local authorities raised a crew and provincial naval vessel to hunt pirates in the summer of 1726, Cornwall stopped them and fired on the vessel when the provincial sailors refused to stop for him.

He returned to England in August 1728, and made an unsuccessful attempt to represent the seat of Weobley on 30 January 1730, losing to John Birch. When Birch was expelled from Parliament due to his involvement in the fraudulent sale of the Derwentwater estates, Cornewall stood again and defeated him on 14 April 1732. In December of that year he was back at sea, this time commanding , which he sailed to the coast of Morocco establishing friendly relations with the Barbary pirates of Salé and the bashaw of Tétouan.

In March 1734 he was back in England, where he unsuccessfully attempted to retain his seat in the General Election of that year, losing once again to John Birch. Cornewall had sought to overturn the result of the 1734 election on the basis that "the right of election [at Weobley] was in the occupiers or owners of certain 'ancient vote-houses' and not in the householders at large." By the time the House came to consider this petition, Birch was no longer alive to defend his side of the argument, resulting in Cornewall once more being appointed to the seat on 3 March 1737.

He was not able to spend much time in the House, only recorded as voting twice and speaking once. He was rumoured to have carried a cargo of slaves to Barbados himself, but the Admiralty were unable to find any evidence to support this allegation.

In 1743, still sailing in Mathews' Mediterranean fleet, he took up his final command: . On 11 February 1744 he was next astern of Mathews' flagship, during the botched Battle of Toulon. Marlborough and Namur bore the brunt of the Spanish fire, with Marlborough losing 43 killed and 120 wounded from its crew of 750 men. Amongst the killed was Cornewall, with both his legs carried away by a chain-shot early in the action, living only long enough "to express the agony he was in, by shaking his head at the surgeon." Command passed to his cousin, Frederick Cornewall, who was First Lieutenant aboard the Marlborough, but he too was severely wounded and lost his right arm. Captain Cornewall was buried at sea.

News of Cornewall's death was greeted by a public show of grief comparable with that following the loss of Nelson sixty years later, though the man had led a solid but unspectacular naval career. As Horace Walpole later put it, "In the present dearth of glory [Cornewall] is canonized, though poor man! he had been tried twice the year before for cowardice."

Family

Cornewall never married, but he had an Illegitimate son by a Mrs Hannah Southwark of Boston named Thomas Cornewall (d. 1796), to whom he left £4000 in his will. Thomas would follow his father into the Royal Navy and became a Captain himself in 1757. The bulk of James Cornewall's estate was left to his Half-brother Henry Cornewall, with instructions that it should pass to their brother Velters on Henry's death.

Memorials

In 1747 a monument to Cornewall was commissioned to stand in Westminster Abbey. Designed by Sir Robert Taylor, it was unveiled in 1749 and was the first ever monument to be erected by Parliament at public expense, as well as probably being the earliest representation of Britannia on a monument. It stood at the West end of the nave near the entrance of St George's Chapel. In 1882 the monument was modified to make a doorway into the chapel, and in 1932 it was moved altogether when St George's was made a war memorial chapel. It now stands in the entrance archway to the Abbey's Cloister. An earlier attempt to move the monument to make room for one to Lord Salisbury was dropped after navy objections.

A ship named  in honour of the Captain was launched in 1761. Frederick Cornewall was its first commander.

References

1698 births
1744 deaths
British military personnel killed in the War of the Austrian Succession
British MPs 1727–1734
British MPs 1734–1741
Burials at sea
Burials at Westminster Abbey
Members of the Parliament of Great Britain for English constituencies
Royal Navy officers
Royal Navy personnel of the War of the Austrian Succession